Alan John Henry Maclean is a former Jersey politician. He was the Minister for Treasury and Resources, and before that the Minister for Economic Development. He was first elected to the States of Jersey, as a Deputy for Saint Helier, in the Jersey 2005 general election. He did not seek re-election in the 2018 elections and was superseded by Susie Pinel.

See also
Council of Ministers of Jersey

References

External links

 Economic Development

Senators of Jersey
Living people
Deputies of Jersey
Jersey businesspeople
Government ministers of Jersey
Year of birth missing (living people)